Riverland is a census-designated place and unincorporated community in Rosedale Township, Mahnomen County, Minnesota, United States. Its population was 276 at the 2010 census.

Demographics

References

Census-designated places in Mahnomen County, Minnesota
Census-designated places in Minnesota